The Western International School of Shanghai (WISS) is an international school located in Xujing Town in the Qingpu district on the western side of the Huangpu River, Shanghai.

WISS is an International Baccalaureate (IB) World School which educates students from preschool through high school. WISS offers the Primary Years Programme (PYP), Middle Years Programme (MYP), and Diploma Programme (DP).

WISS has more than 50 different nationalities represented in the school community and has programmes in the arts as well as community projects. The school campus is spread across a  site which was designed by Weimar Architects of the Bauhaus University in Weimar, Germany. The school facilities consist of a theatre, gymnasiums, swimming pools, large field, soccer turf pitch, outdoor basketball court, science labs, art studios, dance studios, tech labs, computers labs, open-plan library, cafeteria, fine arts wing, three playgrounds, and large classrooms.

History

WISS was granted approval by the Ministry of Education in Beijing in 2004 and opened its doors on September 6, 2006. WISS was opened to cater for expatriates in Shanghai who want an international education based on the full continuum of the IB, being the first International school in Shanghai to offer all three IB Programmes.

Languages

WISS has a second language programme in Mandarin and offers Spanish, French, and German in the Secondary School. Afterschool mother tongue programmes are offered on campus in Dutch, French, German, Spanish, Finnish, Slovakian and Swedish.

Activities and sports

WISS offers sports and activities for Nursery through to Grade 10 in conjunction with the school curriculum. These include but are not limited to: Basketball, Volleyball, Swimming, Soccer, Rugby, Badminton, Ping Pong (Table Tennis), Gymnastics, Wushu, Dance, Piano, Multi Sports, Computer Club, Art & Craft, Jewellery Making, Cooking, Girl Scouts, Lego Engineering Workshop, Chinese Poetry, Ballet, Model Making, school newspaper. The soccer program is done by Stoke City FC, with coaches from the Premier League-club in United Kingdom.

Affiliations

WISS is authorized and affiliated to many other groups:

IB – International Baccalaureate

WASC – Western Association of Schools and Colleges (Candidate School)

SISA – Shanghai International Schools’ Association

UCAS – University and College Admissions Service

CISSA – Chinese International Schools’ Sports Association

ACT – American College Testing (Approved Examination Center)

See also 
 List of international schools in Shanghai
 List of international schools

References

External links 
http://www.wiss.cn

International schools in Shanghai
International Baccalaureate schools in China
Educational institutions established in 2006
Private schools in Shanghai
2006 establishments in China